Abraham Sergio Vuskovic Rojo (19 October 1930 – 19 August 2021), generally known as Sergio Vuskovic, was a Chilean politician, professor and writer. He was the mayor of Valparaíso from 1970 to 1973.

Vuskovic was born in Illapel. During the government of the Unidad Popular, he was appointed Mayor of the city of Valparaíso. After the coup of 1973, he was arrested and tortured in La Esmeralda. Later he was taken to Dawson Island, where he remained for eight months.

In 1988 he was granted the Cittadinanza Onoraria of the city of Martignano, Province of Lecce, Italy.

Books
 La base material del pensamiento, 1958
 Investigaciones sobre el origen del pensamiento, 1961
 Diálogo con la Democracia Cristiana, 1964
 Teoría de la ambigüedad, 1964
 Revolución, Estado, Propiedad: problemática demócrata cristiana, 1967
 Un filósofo llamado Lenin, 1971
 El proceso revolucionario chileno, 1973
 Del stalinismo a la perestroika, 1991
 Breviario de Platón, 1998

References

External links
 Curriculum de Sergio Vuskovic in Spanish

1930 births
2021 deaths
Chilean political writers
Chilean people of Croatian descent
Mayors of Valparaíso
People from Illapel